Svalbard has a population of approximately 2,395 people as of 2011. Approximately 70% of the people are Norwegians; the remaining 30% are Russian and Ukrainian. The official language of Svalbard is Norwegian. Russian is used in the Russian settlements, but formerly, Russenorsk was the lingua franca of the entire Barents Sea region.

The annual population growth is −0.02%, but as may be seen from the following chart, the ex-Soviet population has atrophied, while the Norwegians have been increasing.

Norwegian
Norwegian is the official, and main language, of the archipelago. The weekly Svalbardposten is published in it.

Mainly Norwegian-speaking settlements include Longyearbyen, the capital, Ny-Ålesund and Sveagruva.

Polish
Polish Polar Station is located at Hornsund.

Russian

Mainly Russian-speaking settlements include Barentsburg.

Some Russian is spoken in Svalbard's capital, Longyearbyen, and appears in some signage.

Abandoned communities which spoke Russian include Grumant until 1961, and Pyramiden until 2000.

Chinese
The Arctic Yellow River Station was established in 2003, by the People's Republic of China.

Dutch
Smeerenburg was Dutch-speaking until about 1660. The name itself is Dutch for "blubber town". There was also a Dutch whaling station on Ytre Norskøya and several other locations in Svalbard as well.

The Netherlands still retains a research station at Ny-Ålesund.

Danish
The Danes were also present at Smeerenburg from 1619–23, 1625 and 1631. They also built a seasonal settlement in Kobbefjorden, which they occupied for a quarter century (1631–58).

English
English was spoken from the many whaling settlements established in Svalbard from 1611 to 1670.

French
French was spoken at the whaling settlement in Hamburgbukta, which was occupied from 1633 to 1638. France now maintains a research station at Ny-Ålesund.

Other languages
At present, Germany, the United Kingdom, France, Italy, Japan and South Korea all maintain research stations at Ny-Ålesund, although not all are inhabited year-round.

Former and extinct languages
The history of Russenorsk or Russonorsk (Norwegian for "Russo-Norwegian") is mainly limited to the 18th and 19th centuries. The Russian Revolution of 1917 brought about an end to its use; it is reported that the last Norwegian–Russian trade occurred in 1923, marking the last use of Russenorsk.

Russenorsk was a pidgin language combining elements of Russian and Norwegian, created by traders and whalers from northern Norway and the Russian Kola peninsula. Another name for the language was Moja på tvoja that parodied a perverted Russian phrase, meaning something like "I can speak in your language" (from the Russian words  "my",  here used to mean "in"  "your")

Swedish
Swedish and Norwegian are mutually comprehensible to a considerable degree.

Pyramiden, which later became Soviet, was founded by a Swedish company in 1910.

References

Culture of Svalbard